Burzubənd (also, Birziband and Burzubend) is a village and municipality in the Astara Rayon of Azerbaijan. It has a population of 978. The municipality consists of the villages of Burzubənd, Vənəşikəş, and Noyabud.

References

External links 

Populated places in Astara District